West Mahé is a region of Seychelles.

References 

Mahé, Seychelles